Jon Robert Gibson (born January 3, 1962) is an American singer, songwriter, multi-instrumental musician and record producer. Originally a blue-eyed soul singer, he switched from secular music to contemporary Christian music in the late-1980s.

Gibson scored a number of hit singles, including "Jesus Loves Ya" (which spent a then-record 11 weeks at No. 1 on the CCM charts in 1991), "Love Come Down" (1990), "Friend in You" (1988) and "God Loves a Broken Heart" (1986).

Gibson ranked No. 59 out of all Christian artists in the 1980s. His album Jesus Loves Ya was ranked No. 90 on CCM Magazines The 100 Greatest Albums in Christian Music, while the title track charted at No. 52 on the Top 100 Christian AC in 1991. According to Frontline Records and Gibson's website, he has at least 22 chart-topping CCM hits with 9 No. 1 songs.

Gibson has recorded with Bill Wolfer (the keyboardist for the Jacksons), Michael Jackson, Stevie Wonder, MC Hammer, MC Peace, Crystal Lewis, Soup the Chemist, Avery Stafford, John P. Kee, Scott Blackwell and others. He has also performed with Carman and for Prince, collaborating with Justin Timberlake, Herbie Hancock, Maroon 5 and Matthew McConaughey.

Early life 
Gibson was born in San Francisco on January 3, 1962. Before returning to the Bay Area as a teenager, he grew up in San Jose, California. After several encounters with the law (including being stabbed), and time spent in juvenile hall, Gibson joined the United States Army at the age of 18. He was given an honorable medical discharge eleven months later, due to an allergic reaction from military vaccines, after serving in the 3rd Infantry Division in Germany.

Upon returning home to pursue a music career, and with a natural ability to write songs, Gibson performed in California nightclubs with his band in the early 1980s. After finding his father had become a Christian, Gibson accepted Christ in his father's car following a church service, and then was baptized by his father in their bathtub.

Music career

Secular beginnings 
Prior to his professional career, Gibson played drums and provided backing vocals for the San Francisco heavy metal band Winterhawk. Their second album, Dog Soldier (1980), included Gibson and was released via Mother Earth Records (a remastered version was reissued via Don Giovanni Records in 2021).

In 1982, at the age of 20, Gibson signed with Dick Griffey's Constellation Records (SOLAR) as a rhythm and blues artist. His debut came as a guest vocalist and songwriter on several songs for Bill Wolfer (the keyboardist for the Jacksons), on his Wolf album, via the Constellation label. The album included Michael Jackson singing background vocals on the Gibson/Wolfer collaboration "So Shy". Griffey circulated Gibson's demo tape, with people believing they were listening to Stevie Wonder, who Gibson sang "Ebony and Ivory" with while on tour in 1983.

Gibson released his debut album, Standing on the One (1983), originally via Constellation (now owned by Unidisc Music). He also produced the single, "She Told Me So" (1983) via Elektra Records, with a music video that premiered on MTV. However, Gibson was torn between his desire for pop stardom and his need to give testimony to his faith. Therefore, he entered the Christian music industry when he signed with Frontline Records after 1985.

Contemporary Christian 
Gibson's second album featured his first rap solo, "Ain't It Pretty" (1985), from On the Run (1986). The album was co-produced by Felton Pilate of Con Funk Shun. On the Run was well received, and rendered his first No. 1 single in contemporary Christian music (CCM) to impact Christian radio. "God Loves a Broken Heart" became one of over twenty Top 10 CCM hits for Gibson. He would also experience success with the No. 1 single "Friend in You", a ballad which is one of CCM's classic hit songs, from his next album.

Gibson wrote and produced "The Wall" as well, the first rap hit in CCM history by a blue-eyed soul singer and/or duo, featuring MC Hammer (a song that Stanley Kirk Burrell – or K.B. – originally identified himself as M.C. Hammer and Gibson as J.G.). Burrell and Tramaine Hawkins previously performed in concerts with Gibson's band at various venues, such as the Beverly Theatre in Beverly Hills (a live performance of "B-Boy Chill" is on YouTube). Gibson was in a gospel rap group with Hammer known as the Holy Ghost Boy(s), with songs later produced and released on their respective albums. Hammer released a song called "Son of the King" on his debut album, Feel My Power (1986). Gibson released "The Wall" on his third album, Change of Heart (1988). The album included Gibson's cover version of "Yah Mo B There" (co-written by Rod Temperton and Quincy Jones), a song originally performed by James Ingram and Michael McDonald.

Gibson collaborated with Stevie Wonder on his fourth album, Body & Soul (1989). Wonder played harmonica on a remake of his own song, "Have a Talk with God", from Songs in the Key of Life (1976). The album peaked at No. 23 on July 29, 1989 (charting for 25 weeks) Wonder's soundtrack album, Jungle Fever (1991), had Gibson singing backup on the track "I Go Sailing" (as well as touring together).

Gibson's fifth album, Jesus Loves Ya (1990), featured multiple musicians including Rob Watson and Doug Webb. It produced two hit singles: the title track and "Love Come Down". In 1991, "Jesus Loves Ya" was a top selling CCM single, spending a record eleven weeks at No. 1 on the CCM charts. However, several elements frustrated the relationship between Gibson and Frontline Records. The main issue was the fact that Gibson was receiving little if no payment for his recordings.

His sixth album, Forever Friends (1992), yielded five Top 10 hits and was voted Album of the Year by CCM Magazine. The album peaked at No. 3 on August 8, 1992 (charting for 37 weeks), but Frontline Records ran into serious financial trouble. "My contract was over when I completed the album Forever Friends... I was definitely free from Frontline", Gibson says. He decided to form his own record label called New Soul Records, resulting in a nearly three-year hiatus before releasing his seventh album, Love Education (1995). The album peaked at No. 19 on April 15, 1995 (charting for 5 weeks).

Gibson later signed with Ojo Taylor and Gene Eugene of Brainstorm Artists International (BAI). He then got married, had children and took time off from his music again. Gibson searched for a record contract for two years, before landing with the gospel record label B-Rite Music for his eighth album, The Man Inside (1999). It was a consciously urban-sounding album made with producer Tommy Sims. It didn't fare as well as previous records, therefore Gibson created Imagery Records for his ninth album. He released his first praise album, Soulful Hymns (2002), via his own label.

In June 2010, Gibson released the single "On a Mission", which was available for download. A portion of the funding for a Project 10 album was raised via Kickstarter. The planned album, The Horizons of Knowing, went unreleased in late 2010. "I'm On a Mission" eventually appeared on Gibson's tenth album, The Storyteller (2012), a tribute album to his father Stan Gibson (who led him to the Christian faith in 1981). It was released on his independent record label by Soul Scan Music, and mixed by engineer Dennis Moody.

Gibson released the single "Silent War" in March 2022, marking his first new music in a decade. The track was made public for download on Gibson's website and social media. He is currently working on his eleventh studio album.

Musical training and style 
Gibson writes, arranges and produces most of his albums, as well as plays most of the instruments. Comments Gibson: 

Throughout his career, Gibson has straddled many musical styles (including reggae and jazz), limiting the promotion of his career. His freestyle vocal skills (such as scat singing) have been compared to singers like Ella Fitzgerald and Bobby McFerrin. His unique vocal tone has primarily been compared to Stevie Wonder, Michael Jackson and Donny Hathaway (as well as Bill Withers and Marvin Gaye). According to Chris Rizik of SoulTracks,<ref name="SoulTracks" Gibson was difficult to classify. "Gibson's a white guy who sounds like Stevie Wonder, a sweet balladeer who pioneered Christian rap, and a singer who reeks attitude in his mission of justice and ministry."

Gibson employed an eclectic soul band called The Groove Masters. In 2005, Prince hired Gibson's band for his Golden Globe Awards house party, collaborating with Justin Timberlake, Herbie Hancock, Maroon 5 and Matthew McConaughey.

Personal life 
Gibson married Lisa Rea (an industry professional) in 1995, and had three children: Jonathon Thomas Gibson, James Robert Gibson and Jesse Earl Gibson. After his youngest son was born on Christmas day in 2004, Gibson became an ordained minister in 2005.

Gibson was a frequent guest on Trinity Broadcasting Network, and helped launch their studio in Milan, Italy. Among other songs, he also sang a jazzy version of "Amazing Grace" with Carman, during a 2007 episode.

Gibson has led worship services nationally, and performed for multi-genre audiences and celebrities. He was also a worship pastor at a California church, and a former music director of CSN Radio (KAWZ). Between 2014–2019, Gibson was the program director and network manager of the Christian music radio stations for Effect Radio (in Twin Falls, Idaho).

Gibson currently resides in Las Vegas, Nevada.

Discography 
 Standing on the One (1983) – 12-inch vinyl debut album with title track & "She Told Me So"
 On the Run (1986) (re-released 1990) – No. 1: "God Loves a Broken Heart" with "Metal Machine"
 Change of Heart (1988) – No. 1: "Friend in You" & "The Wall" (ft. MC Hammer) with "Yah Mo B There"
 Body & Soul (1989) – Top Ten Hits: "Father Father", "In the Name of the Lord" & "Everyone Needs the Lord"
 Jesus Loves Ya (1990) – No. 1: "Jesus Loves Ya" & "Love Come Down" with "In Too Deep"
 The Hits (1991) – top hits with "Jesus Loves Ya (Blackwell Remix)" & "Everybody Sing a Christmas Song"
 Forever Friends (1992) – 5 Top Ten Hits with 4 No. 1s: "Happy to Know Jesus" (ft. MC Peace), "Can't Live Without Jesus", "You Are the One", "Forever Friends" & "Found a Home"
 Songs of Encouragement and Healing (1994) – compilation album of songs from previous records
 Love Education (1995) – 3 Top Ten Hits with title track & "Possessed by Love"
 The Man Inside (1999) – No. 20 on [[Billboard charts#Christian|Billboard'''s Top Gospel Albums]] with title track & "God Will Find Ya" 
 Live in '85 (2000 CD) (2017 MP3) – bootleg concert album with "I Love Her Anyway" (1983) & "Ain't It Pretty" (1985)
 Soulful Hymns (2002) – soul versions of traditional hymns with "Awesome God" & "Amazing Grace"
 Spirit of Christmas (2009) – Christmas album by Northern Light Orchestra with Gibson as a member
 The Horizons of Knowing (2010) – unreleased Project 10 album funded by Kickstarter
 The Storyteller (2012) – urban contemporary album with title track & "I'm on a Mission"

Note: Double albums Change of Heart/Body & Soul and Jesus Loves Ya/Forever Friends were released by KMG Records in 2003.

 Additional credits and collaborations 
 Wolf (1983) by Bill Wolfer features Gibson on tracks including "Wake Up" and "Why Do You Do Me"
 "Breakdown" (1987) by Crystal Lewis was written by Gibson from her debut album Beyond the Charade "Lost Inside of You" (1988) by Gibson features Crystal Lewis from Change of Heart "Enough is Enough" (1990) by Gibson features MC Peace (aka Peace 586) from Jesus Loves Ya "You Are the One" (1992) by Gibson features MC Peace and "Happier Than the Morning Sun" (1972) was written by Stevie Wonder from Forever Friends "As the Sun Rises" (2000) by Soup the Chemist features Gibson and samples "Dust in the Wind" by Kansas from Dust Gospel: Rhythm of the Heart (2001) features an interview and performance by Gibson in the music documentary film
 "Gone with You" (2006) by Gibson from Not in My Family: Songs of Healing and Inspiration End of Five (2008) by Avery Stafford features Gibson's production and vocals on "My Friend" and "Everyday" (2010)
"My Worship Remix" (2012) by John P. Kee and the New Life Community Choir features Gibson from Life and Favor'' (peaked at No. 32)

Notable concerts and tours 
 Frontline Records Music Celebration at Knott's Berry Farm in Buena Park, California during May 1985 and 1986
 New Year's Eve Alternative Celebration at Knott's Berry Farm in Buena Park, California on December 31, 1986
 California's Great America (sponsored by Marriott) in Santa Clara, California during May 1990
 Calvary Chapel of Palm Desert near Cathedral City, California (solo concert) on March 15, 1991
 Hallelujah Jubilee 1992 at Magic Mountain's Showcase Theatre near Santa Clarita, California in October 1992
 The Gathering and The Bridge Church Service concerts at Woodbridge Community Church in Irvine, California
 HOPEFEST 2015 in Prescott, Arizona with The Billy Spoon Band and Rhett Walker Band on October 3, 2015
Facebook Live concerts (including album fundraisers and past benefit concerts) beginning in May 2022

References

External links 
 

1962 births
Living people
20th-century American singers
21st-century American singers
American male singer-songwriters
American soul musicians
Singers from San Francisco
Performers of Christian contemporary R&B music
20th-century American male singers
21st-century American male singers
Singer-songwriters from California